North Ryde railway station is located on the Metro North West Line, serving the Sydney suburb of North Ryde, New South Wales, Australia. Formerly part of the Sydney Trains T1 Northern Line, the station started operating under the Sydney Metro network from May 2019.

History

North Ryde station opened on 23 February 2009 on the same date as the Chatswood to Epping line. It was built on the site of Network Ten's former television studios, now occupied by apartments named Ryde Gardens. It serves the nearby Lachlan's Line town centre (under construction September 2018).

The original, proposed name of the station was Delhi Road after the adjacent street. On 12 June 2006, North Ryde Railway Station was submitted to the Geographical Names Board of New South Wales as the provisional official name of the station.

North Ryde station closed in September 2018 for seven months for conversion to a Sydney Metro station on the Metro North West Line, which included the installation of platform screen doors. It reopened on 26 May 2019.

Services

Busways operates one route via North Ryde station. It is also served by one NightRide route.

References

External links

North Ryde station details Transport for New South Wales

Easy Access railway stations in Sydney
Railway stations in Australia opened in 2009
Sydney Metro stations
City of Ryde